Pilot Grove Township is one of twenty-four townships in Hancock County, Illinois, USA.  As of the 2010 census, its population was 280 and it contained 131 housing units.

Geography

Unincorporated towns
 Burnside at 
(This list is based on USGS data and may include former settlements.)

Cemeteries
The township contains these two cemeteries: McKay and Pilot Grove.

Major highways
  Illinois Route 94

Airports and landing strips
 Brooks Ranch Airport
 Lung RLA Airport

Lakes
 Linda Lake

Demographics

School districts
 Nauvoo-Colusa Community Unit School District 325

Political districts
 Illinois's 18th congressional district
 State House District 94
 State Senate District 47

References
 United States Census Bureau 2008 TIGER/Line Shapefiles
 
 United States National Atlas

External links
 City-Data.com
 Illinois State Archives
 Township Officials of Illinois

Townships in Hancock County, Illinois
Townships in Illinois